Nemoria obliqua is a species of emerald moth in the family Geometridae. It is found in Central America and North America.

The MONA or Hodges number for Nemoria obliqua is 7037.

Subspecies
These two subspecies belong to the species Nemoria obliqua:
 Nemoria obliqua hennei Sperry, 1953
 Nemoria obliqua obliqua

References

Further reading

External links

 

Geometrinae
Articles created by Qbugbot
Moths described in 1898